The 2018 Bill Beaumont County Championship Division 2, was the 17th version of the competition that is part of the annual English rugby union County Championship organised by the RFU for the tier 2 English counties.  Each county drew its players from rugby union clubs from the third tier and below of the English rugby union league system (typically National League 1, National League 2 North or National League 2 South).  The counties were divided into two regional pools (north/south) with four teams in each and the winners of each pool meeting in the final at Twickenham Stadium.  Leicestershire were the reigning champions, having won the 2017 final.

At the end of the group stage, Durham County won the northern group with ease despite having another strong side, and 2017 winners, Leicestershire, in their pool.  They were joined by southern winners Warwickshire who beat off stiff competition from Hampshire to qualify.  At the Twickenham final, Durham showed that they were best side in the division by comfortably beating Warwickshire, 46-12, for what would be the county's first ever Division 2 victory and first county silverware since 2009.  

By showing the best form over two years, Durham County were promoted from the northern group, just edging Leicestershire by virtue of a better for/against record, while Hampshire were promoted from the southern group despite missing out on the final.  Both counties will play in the 2019 Bill Beaumont Cup.  At the opposite end of the tables, Cumbria (north) and North Midlands (south) were relegated to the 2019 County Championship Shield.  In the case of Cumbria they actually finished above Staffordshire on points/for against over the two years, but still went down for reasons that are not yet clear.

Competition format
The competition format was two regional group stages divided into north and south with four teams in each group. This means that two teams in the pool had two home games, while the other two had just one.  The RFU took fixtures from the previous year into account so that county sides that only played one home game in that competition now get two games and vice versa.  At the end of the group stage the top teams with the best record from each group (north and south) advance to the final held on 27 May 2018 at Twickenham Stadium.  

A continuation from the 2017 competition was that promotion/relegation occurred every two seasons instead of one, with points accumulated over the two seasons (2017 and 2018) taken into consideration.  The two highest ranked counties (one from the north/one from the south) were promoted into the 2019 Bill Beaumont Cup competition, replacing the lowest ranked aggregate sides who dropped down into Division 2.  Relegation was also introduced with the bottom two ranked sides (again one north/one south) over the two years dropping to the 2019 Bill Beaumont County Championship Division 3 and being replaced by the top two teams from the 2018 Bill Beaumont County Championship Division 3.

Participating counties and ground locations

Group stage

Division 2 North

Round 1

Round 2

Round 3

Division 2 South

Round 1

Round 2

Round 3

Final

Promotion/relegation aggregate table

In order to determine promotion to the 2019 Bill Beaumont County Championship Division 1 and relegation to the 2019 Bill Beaumont County Championship Division 3, results from the 2017 and 2018 competitions will be combined, with the highest and lowest ranked sides from each group being  promoted or relegated.

Individual statistics
 Note that points scorers includes tries as well as conversions, penalties and drop goals.  Appearance figures also include coming on as substitutes (unused substitutes not included).  Statistics will also include final.

Top points scorers

Top try scorers

Competition records

Team
Largest home win — 92 points
99 - 7 Durham County at home to Staffordshire on 12 May 2018
Largest away win — 60 points
66 - 5 Hampshire away to Somerset on 12 May 2018
Most points scored — 99 points
99 - 7 Durham County at home to Staffordshire on 12 May 2018
Most tries in a match — 15
Durham County at home to Staffordshire on 12 May 2018
Most conversions in a match — 12
Durham County at home to Staffordshire on 12 May 2018
Most penalties in a match — 2 (4)
Hampshire at home to North Midlands on 5 May 2018
Hampshire away to Somerset on 12 May 2018
Durham County at home to Leicestershire on 19 May 2018
Durham County versus Warwickshire at Twickenham on 27 May 2018
Most drop goals in a match — 0

Player
Most points in a match — 26
 Joel Knight for Hampshire away to Somerset on 12 May 2018
Most tries in a match — 3 (4)
 Grant Connon for Durham County at home to Staffordshire on 12 May 2018
 Callum Dacey for Leicestershire at home to Cumbria on 12 May 2018
 Oliver Hodgson for Durham County at home to Staffordshire on 12 May 2018
 Kemp Price for Hampshire away to Somerset on 12 May 2018
Most conversions in a match — 12
 Warren Seals for Durham County at home to Staffordshire on 12 May 2018
Most penalties in a match — 2 (4)
 Grant Hancox for Hampshire at home to North Midlands on 5 May 2018
 Joel Knight for Hampshire away to Somerset on 12 May 2018
 Peter Evans for Durham County at home to Leicestershire on 19 May 2018
 Josh Bragman for Durham County versus Warwickshire at Twickenham on 27 May 2018
Most drop goals in a match — 0

Notes

See also
 English rugby union system
 Rugby union in England

References

External links
 NCA Rugby

2018
2017–18 County Championship